Hi! Padosi... Kaun Hai Doshi? is an Indian television comedy series that aired on Sahara One channel, starring Kader Khan. The series was converted from comedy show to drama-series In November 2011 due to a change in concept, and the series was renamed Piya Ka Ghar Pyaara Lage.

Cast
 Sanjeeda Sheikh  as Sejal Mehta
 Giriraj Kabra as Bitto
 Kader Khan as Ram Bharose
 Muni Jha as Hansmukh Lal Mehta
 Gulfam Khan as Tabassum Pasha
 Amit Dolawat as Manav Patel
 Navina Bole as Vibha Rokre
 Himani Chawla as Himani
 Sejal Shah as Mrs. Hansmukh lal Mehta
 Sadat Pervez as Babban Miyan

References

Indian television soap operas
Indian comedy television series
Sahara One original programming
2011 Indian television series debuts
2011 Indian television series endings
2000s Indian television series